Hypothalamic–pituitary hormones are hormones that are produced by the hypothalamus and pituitary gland. Although the organs in which they are produced are relatively small, the effects of these hormones cascade throughout the body. They can be classified as a hypothalamic–pituitary axis (HP axis) of which the adrenal, gonadal, thyroid, somatotropic, and prolactin axes are branches.

It is possible for the function of these hormones to be altered by physical activity.

In posterior pituitary we have hormones that control absorption of water and oxytocin.

Anterior hypophysis, neurosecretory cells which release hormones. There is a pituitary portal system, with which the hormones are transported. These hormones are prolactin, growth hormone, TSH, adrenocorticotropic hormone, FSH and LH. They are all released by anterior pituitary. Some have targets in glands and some with direct function. Anterior pituitary is an amalgam of hormone producing glandular cells.

There are conditions related to the limbic system which regulate the hormone release. And also thalamus, with pain. Many of these stimuli come from the senses of the subject. The temperature control can be found in the hypothalamus. There is also regulation of water balance. And also hunger, and also something associated with water balance control (ADH).

·      Corticotropic releasing hormone CRH: stimulates ACTH secretion

·      Thyrotropin releasing hormone (TRH): stimulates TSH and prolactin secretion

·      Growth hormone releasing hormone (GHRH): stimulates GH secretion

·      Somatostatin: inhibits GH (and other hormone) secretion

·      Gonadotropin releasing hormone (GnRH): stimulates FSH and LH secretion

·      Prolactin releasing hormone (PRH): stimulates PRL secretion

·      Prolactin inhibiting hormone (dopamine): inhibits PRL secretion

These hypothalamic hormones are secreted in pulse. They act on specific membrane receptors. They are glycoproteins. Then you have the signal. They stimulate release of pituitary hormones. They stimulate synthesis of pituitary hormones, stimulate release stored pituitary hormones, stimulate hyperplasia and hypertrophy of target cells and regulate their own receptors.

Anterior pituitary produces prolactin, GH, TSH, ACTH, FSH, LH.

15–20% of corticotroph cells, produce ACTH. The targets are the adrenal glands, adipocytes and melanocytes.

3–5% thyrotroph cells, produce TSH.

10–15%, Gonadotroph, produce LH and FSH

40–50% somatotroph, produce GH in particular in childhood.

10–15% lactotroph, produce prolactin.

References

Hormones of the hypothalamus
Hormones of the pituitary gland
Hormones of the hypothalamus-pituitary axis